Samuel Bridger (born 11 May 1777) was an English professional cricketer.

He was mainly associated with Surrey and he made 21 known appearances in first-class matches from 1804 to 1825.

References

1777 births
English cricketers
English cricketers of 1787 to 1825
Surrey cricketers
Year of death unknown
Non-international England cricketers
Godalming Cricket Club cricketers
The Bs cricketers